Astor Island is an island lying between Rugged Island and Livingston Island in the South Shetland Islands, Antarctica. Surface area .

The feature was named by the United Kingdom Antarctic Place-Names Committee in 1958 for B. Astor of the New York Lyceum of Natural History (now the American Museum of Natural History).

Maps
 Península Byers, Isla Livingston. Mapa topográfico a escala 1:25000. Madrid: Servicio Geográfico del Ejército, 1992.
 L.L. Ivanov et al. Antarctica: Livingston Island and Greenwich Island, South Shetland Islands. Scale 1:100000 topographic map. Sofia: Antarctic Place-names Commission of Bulgaria, 2005.
 L.L. Ivanov. Antarctica: Livingston Island and Greenwich, Robert, Snow and Smith Islands. Scale 1:120000 topographic map.  Troyan: Manfred Wörner Foundation, 2009.  
 L.L. Ivanov. Antarctica: Livingston Island and Smith Island. Scale 1:100000 topographic map. Manfred Wörner Foundation, 2017.

See also 
 Composite Antarctic Gazetteer
 List of Antarctic islands south of 60° S
 SCAR
 Territorial claims in Antarctica

External links
 SCAR Composite Antarctic Gazetteer.
 

Islands of the South Shetland Islands